On August 9, 2022, two bombings in Namssiguia, Bam Province, Burkina Faso killed 15 Burkinabe soldiers and injured an unknown number of others.

Background 
Throughout the early 2010s, jihadist movements spread widely throughout the Sahel, and reached Burkina Faso in 2015. Since then, the Burkinabe government has struggled to hold back both the Islamist insurgents and the tribal warfare and violence, which has escalated since the war's outbreak. In early 2022, the Burkinabe military under Paul-Henri Damiba overthrew President Roch Kaboré, citing the latter's inability to control the violence as a reason for the coup. However, jihadist attacks continued in Burkina Faso throughout 2022.

Bombing 
Prior to the bombing, jihadists had raided a nearby village and killed five civilians and five militiamen. While Burkinabe soldiers were driving in the region, one truck hit a roadside IED, killing several troops. A second explosion went off after another convoy of soldiers arrived on scene to help the wounded, killing them too.

References 

Explosions in 2022
Explosions in Burkina Faso
2022 in Burkina Faso
Islamism in Burkina Faso
August 2022 crimes in Africa
Bam Province
Jihadist insurgency in Burkina Faso
Namsiguia_bombing, 2022
2022 disasters in Burkina Faso